El Dara is a village in Pike County, Illinois, United States. The population was 78 at the 2010 census, down from 89 in 2000.

Geography
El Dara is located at  (39.622207, -90.992452).

Demographics

As of the 2000 United States Census, there were 89 people, 32 households, and 24 families residing in the village. The racial makeup of the village was 100.00% White.

There were 32 households, out of which 37.5% had children under the age of 18 living with them, 75.0% were married couples living together, 3.1% had a female householder with no husband present, and 21.9% were non-families. 21.9% of all households were made up of individuals, and 21.9% had someone living alone who was 65 years of age or older. The average household size was 2.78 and the average family size was 3.24.

In the village, the population was spread out, with 33.7% under the age of 18, 2.2% from 18 to 24, 25.8% from 25 to 44, 23.6% from 45 to 64, and 14.6% who were 65 years of age or older. The median age was 35 years. For every 100 females, there were 74.5 males. For every 100 females age 18 and over, there were 73.5 males.

The median income for a household in the village was $36,250, and the median income for a family was $48,750. Males had a median income of $30,313 versus $15,000 for females. The per capita income for the village was $11,422. There were 7.7% of families and 9.6% of the population living below the poverty line, including 8.2% of under eighteens and 16.7% of those over 64.

References

Villages in Pike County, Illinois
Villages in Illinois